Belgioioso or Belgiojoso (or  ) is a town and comune in the Province of Pavia, region of Lombardy (northern Italy), with a population of 6,233 (2017).

It is 12 km east of the city of Pavia, between the Olona River and the Po River.  Due to its geographical location, Belgioioso has become one of the southern suburbs of the city of Milan.

Belgioioso is noted for its medieval castle, the seat of the Belgioioso family.  Francis I of France was held there after the Battle of Pavia.

Twin towns
Belgioioso is twinned with:

  La Fouillouse, France

References 

Cities and towns in Lombardy